The Kulai District is a district in the state of Johor, Malaysia. Its district capital is Kulai Town. It covers Kulai Town, Ayer Bemban, Bandar Putra Kulai, Bukit Batu, Indahpura, Bandar Baru Kangkar Pulai, Kelapa Sawit, Saleng, Sedenak, Seelong, Senai, and Sengkang. Kulai is also within Iskandar Malaysia economic zone.

Name
The district was formerly part of Pulai Valley, which covered  Mukim Pulai and the current subdistrict. The name Kulai 龟来 which means turtles are coming was a Chinese mispronounciation of Pulai. Chinese Hakka peoples led by Huang Guo Mao migrated to Johor at 1892 and opened a settlement in the area renamed the place after the influx of turtle coming to the area after heaving flooding.

Geography
With an area of 753.75 km2, Kulai is the smallest district in Johor, covering 3.96% of the state area  and a population of 223,306 at the 2010 Census (provisional result). It has a mix of urban and rural settlements with a majority of the population settling in towns near Johor Bahru. These population centers, such as Kulai and Senai effectively became suburbs of the greater metropolitan area in Kulai district.

History

The earliest settlement in Kulai is located at Sayong River, now at Bandar Tenggara, which have existed since the Srivijayan era. The Orang Asli settlement at the upstream of Sayong River was the hometown to the Malays and Singaporean folklore heroes Badang. Badang was the Hulubalang during the reign of Raja Sri Rana Wikrama of the Kingdom of Singapura, a Srivijayan city kingdom prior to the establishment of Sultanate of Malacca. This suggest that the settlement in Sungai Sayong should had been established no later than 12th century. 

In 1548, after the demise of last Sultan of Melaka in exile, Mahmud Shah, his prince Alauddin Shah moved his capital from Kampar, Sumatra to Sayong and established the new Kota Sayong Pinang. Kota Sayong was the first capital of Sultanate of Johor on the mainland peninsular. The Sultan later moved the capital city to Kota Batu at the mouth of Johor River. 

The modern district of Kulai was a former sub-district of Johor Bahru. The subdistrict was upgraded to the full district status on 1 January 2008  as District of Kulaijaya. The district is recognised as the state's 9th district. On 28 August 2015, Sultan of Johor Sultan Ibrahim Ismail ibni Sultan Iskandar decreed to revert Kulaijaya's name back to its original name.

Government

The local authorities of Kulai are Kulai Municipal Council and Iskandar Puteri City Council, the part of southern Kulai, etc.: Kangkar Pulai. Kulai Town also the administry centre of Kulai District and Kulai Municipal Council.

Administrative divisions

Kulai District is divided into 4 mukims:
 Bukit Batu
 Kulai Town
 Sedenak
 Senai

Demography 

Malay made up 44.3% of the total population in Kulai. This is followed by Malaysian Chinese (40.1%) and Malaysian Indian (4.1%).

Federal Parliament and State Assembly Seats

List of Kulai district representatives in the Federal Parliament (Dewan Rakyat) 

List of Kulai district representatives in the State Legislative Assembly (Dewan Undangan Negeri)

Other Towns
 Kulai Town
 Ayer Bemban
 Bukit Batu
 Kangkar Pulai
 Kelapa Sawit
 Saleng
 Sedenak
 Seelong
 Senai

Economy
The main economy activities in the district are information and communication technology, biotechnology and logistics.

Tourist attractions

 Johor Premium Outlets
 Mount Pulai
 Hutan Bandar Putra Kulai (Putra Recreation Forest)
 Nanyan Aquarium Centre, Ayer Bemban
 Hua Guo Shan Temple, Sedenak (士年纳路口花果山)
 Kulai Putuo Village (古来普陀村)

Transportation

Roads 

Skudai Highway or Federal route 1 is the most important inner link in Kulai District, with many access along the road such as Senai Airport Highway 16, Skudai–Pontian Highway 5,  Jalan Kulai-Kota Tinggi 94, Diamond Interchange (access to Bandar Putra, Indahpura and proposed new NSE exit), proposed Kulai Inner Ring Road. The government proposed to open a new road, Kulai-Senai Bypass, to resolve the traffic jam problem of the Skudai Highway.

Kulai was an important stopover on the Johor Bahru-Kuala Lumpur trunk road in the 1970s and 1980s until the North–South Expressway (NSE) E2 opened in 1994, which bypassed the town. Senai North Interchange (NSE)253 is the connection to Singapore (from the east to the west).NSE is also one of the access points to the Mount Pulai nature reserve. Senai Airport, the international airport which serves Johor is within the municipality.

The Second Link Expressway E3 is also an access to connect to Iskandar Puteri, Singapore (Tuas). The Senai–Desaru Expressway (SDE)  connects Senai and Desaru more quickly.

Rails
The district also has one railway station run by the Malayan Railway (KTM) in Kulai Town.

Airport 

The district houses the Senai International Airport which is located in Senai.

See also
 Kulai
 Districts of Malaysia

References

External links 

 Kulai District Education Department's Website